Abolfazl Soroush is an Iranian physician and reformist politician who is currently a member of the Parliament of Iran representing Tehran, Rey, Shemiranat and Eslamshahr electoral district.

Career 
Soroush was formerly an activist and a leading member at the Islamic Association of Students. He has chaired Iranian Students' News Agency's office at the Tehran University of Medical Sciences.

Electoral history

References

Living people
Iranian activists
Iranian journalists
Members of the 10th Islamic Consultative Assembly
Islamic Association of Iranian Medical Society politicians
People from Tehran
Volunteer Basij personnel of the Iran–Iraq War
Year of birth missing (living people)